Zhou Xianwang (born November 1962) is a Chinese politician currently serving as vice chairman of the Hubei Provincial Committee of the Chinese People's Political Consultative Conference. Previously, he served as Deputy Party Committee Secretary and mayor of Wuhan. He is of Tujia heritage. He entered the workforce in September 1980, and joined the Chinese Communist Party in January 1987.

Biography
Zhou was born in Jianshi County, Hubei, in November 1962. Zhou served in his home-county for a long time, what he was promoted to deputy magistrate in February 1993. He was secretary of Enshi Tujia and Miao Autonomous Prefecture Committee of the Communist Youth League in January 1994, and held that office until September 1995. In September 1995 he was promoted to become deputy party secretary and magistrate of Xuan'en County, a position he held until April 1998. He served as vice-mayor of Enshi Tujia and Miao Autonomous Prefecture in April 1998, and four years later promoted to the mayor position. In February 2008, he was appointed head of Hubei Provincial Department of Commerce and director of Hubei Provincial Foreign Investment Office, he remained in that position until November 2012, when he was transferred to Huangshi and appointed the party secretary. He concurrently served as deputy governor of Hubei from March 2017 to May 2018. In May 2018, he was named acting mayor and deputy party secretary of Wuhan, replacing Wan Yong. On January 26, 2021, he was elected vice chairman of the Hubei Provincial Committee of the Chinese People's Political Consultative Conference.

Criticism

In December 2019, a new coronavirus, designated SARS-CoV-2, broke out in Wuhan, local people accused Zhou and his superior, Party secretary Ma Guoqiang of being slow to respond to the epidemic. On January 27, 2020, in an interview on China Central Television, Zhou acknowledged that the city government had failed to promptly disclose information about the outbreak while stating that "as a local government, we need to get authorisation before disclosure" which led many to think that he was pointing at the central government for being slow on giving him authorisation. Zhou then offered to resign over the January 23 decision to lock down the city.

In addition, Zhou was criticized for hosting the Baibuting banquet on January 18, 2020, where 40,000 Wuhan families cooked and ate a communal meal in celebration of the New Year, five days before the city went into lockdown.

References

External links 
 

1962 births
People from Jianshi County
Living people
Hubei University alumni
Central Party School of the Chinese Communist Party alumni
Delegates to the 11th National People's Congress
Delegates to the 10th National People's Congress
Mayors of Wuhan
People's Republic of China politicians from Hubei
Chinese Communist Party politicians from Hubei
Tujia people